Kearse is a surname, and may refer to:

Amalya Lyle Kearse (born 1937), American judge
Eddie Kearse (1916–1968), American baseball player 
Frank Kearse (born 1988), American football player
Jayron Kearse (born 1994), American football player
Jermaine Kearse (born 1990), American football player
Jevon Kearse (born 1976), American football player
NaShawn Kearse (born 1972), American television and film actor